This article lists the prime ministers of Suriname from 1949 to 1988. In 1988 the position of Prime Minister of Suriname was abolished and replaced by a Vice President, who chairs the Council of Ministers ex officio.

List of prime ministers

Political parties

Status

Timeline

See also
 Politics of Suriname
 List of deputy prime ministers of Suriname
 List of colonial governors of Suriname
 President of Suriname
 First Lady of Suriname
 Vice President of Suriname

Notes

References

External links
 World Statesmen – Suriname

Suriname
Prime ministers
Main